Syed Shāh Tāj ad-Dīn was a 14th-century Sufi Muslim figure in the Sylhet region. Tajuddin's name is associated with the propagation of Islam in Osmani Nagar, Aurangpur. In 1315, he joined Shah Kamal Quhafa who was travelling to the Sylhet region to meet Shah Jalal and reunite with his father, Khwaja Burhanuddin Ketan.

Life
Syed Shah Tajuddin was born in Baghdad in the 13th century CE. He is from the Arab tribe of Quraysh, his x10 great grandfather being Jaʿfar, a son of Musa al-Kadhim (745-799 CE). He joined his father, Alauddin, and his brothers, Shah Ruknuddin and Bahauddin and Shamsuddin in accompanying Shah Kamal Quhafa in his quest to meet Shah Jalal and reunite with his father, Burhanuddin.  In 1315, they reached Sylhet and spent some time as a murid of Shah Jalal in Dargah Mahalla.

In June 1315, Jalal then ordered Shah Kamal Quhafa and his 12 dervishes to travel to north-western Taraf and propagate the religion there. The 13 men, as well as Kamal's wife, then set off from Sheikh Ghat along the Surma River in three small bajras known as pangshi (or panshi). The area which they resided in was originally a cluster of islands in body of water called Ratnang. It came to be known as Shaharpara (the neighbourhood of Shahs), on the banks of the Ratna river.

Tajuddin later moved to Gauharpur in the Aurangapur Pargana where he spent the rest of his life.

Death and legacy
He is buried in a mazar in the village of Lama Tajpur in Sadipur Union, Osmani Nagar Upazila. Tajpur in Osmani Nagar, is named after him. Among his descendants, Abdul Ghafur of Sylhet, was notable.

References

People from Baghdad
People from Osmani Nagar Upazila
14th-century Indian Muslims
Bengali Sufi saints